The Uniform Certified Public Accountant Examination (CPA Exam) is the examination administered to people who wish to become U.S. Certified Public Accountants.  The CPA Exam is used by the regulatory bodies of all fifty states plus the District of Columbia, Guam, Puerto Rico, the U.S. Virgin Islands and the Northern Mariana Islands.

The CPA Exam is developed, maintained and scored by the American Institute of Certified Public Accountants (AICPA) and administered at Prometric test centers in partnership with the National Association of State Boards of Accountancy (NASBA).

Exam content
The CPA exam is a sixteen-hour exam tested in four separate sections.  As many as two sections can be taken in a given day or each section can be taken on separate days. The basic outlines of the exam sections are as follows:

 Auditing and Attestation (4.0 hours): (AUD) – This section covers knowledge of planning the engagement, internal controls, obtaining and documenting information, reviewing engagements and evaluating information and preparing communications. This Section contains 72 multiple choice questions (50% weightage) & 8 short task-based simulations (50% weightage).
 Business Environment and Concepts (4.0 hours): (BEC) – This section covers knowledge of business structures, economic concepts, financial management, information technology, and planning and measurement. This Section contains 62 multiple choice questions (50% weightage) & 4 short task-based simulations (35% weightage), written communication (15% weightage)
 Financial Accounting and Reporting (4.0 hours): (FAR) – This section covers knowledge of concepts and standards for financial statements, typical items in financial statements, specific types of transactions and events, accounting and reporting for governmental agencies, and accounting and reporting for non-governmental and not-for-profit organizations. This sections contains 66 multiple choice questions (50% weightage) & 8 short task-based simulations (50% weightage). 
 Regulation (4.0 hours): (REG) – This section covers knowledge of ethics and professional responsibility, business law, Federal tax procedures and accounting issues, Federal taxation of property transactions, Federal taxation – individuals, and Federal taxation – entities. This contains 76 multiple choice questions (50% weightage) & 8 short task-based simulations (50% weightage).

Testing method
For three of the four exam sections (AUD, FAR, and REG), multiple-choice questions represent 50% of the total score, while the other 50% is derived from simulation style questions. For the BEC section of the exam, the score is derived from 50% multiple-choice questions, 35% simulations, and 15% written communication. Accounting knowledge is tested in simulations through a variety of tasks, some of which require searching databases, completing written communication exercises, and working with spreadsheets and forms. The skills that simulations are intended to measure are: analysis, judgment, communication, and research.

As of 2011, BEC is the only section that contains written communication task simulations. This measures the ability of CPA candidates to be able to write effective and coherent standard business English.

Written communication responses are scored on the basis of three criteria:

Organization – structure, ordering of ideas, linking of ideas one to another.
Development – presentation of supporting evidence.
Expression – use of standard business English.

Scoring
A minimum reported score of 75 is required to pass any given section of the CPA Exam.

Eligibility to sit for the exam
In order to sit for the Uniform CPA Exam, a person must be declared eligible to do so by one of the 55 state boards of accountancy in the United States.  Requirements of state boards vary, but almost always include a U.S. bachelor's degree and a certain amount of accounting course credits. Additionally, some states require that candidates have completed an additional year of study (which can be either at an undergraduate or graduate level) before sitting for the exam and almost every state requires that the additional year of study be completed before awarding certification.  The educational requirement equivalent to five years of full-time study is known as the "150-hour rule" (150 college semester units or the equivalent).

Fingerprint collection
The AICPA and NASBA mandate that exam candidates submit to a fingerprinting prior to each exam for identification purposes. According to published AICPA and NASBA reports, all fingerprints collected are immediately transmitted over the Internet to ChoicePoint/Reed Elsevier (Identico Systems) for storage.

Fees
Fees to sit for the Uniform CPA Exam vary by state.

Testing windows
As of July 1, 2020 Continuous Testing for the CPA Exam has been implemented, which means there are no longer any blackout periods where testing is not available.

According to NASBA, “Under the new Continuous Testing model, candidates will have the ability to take the Exam year-round, without restriction, other than waiting to receive scores from prior attempts of the same section or when there is a major change to the Exam. Continuous Testing will replace the existing CPA Exam Testing Window model, which only permits candidates to test during designated time frames each calendar quarter.”

Failed sections
Where a candidate fails a section, it may be re-taken without any penalty other than a re-examination fee and the risk of credits for other sections expiring under the "18-month rule".  Re-sitting for a failed section in the same testing window is not permitted. As of July 1, 2020, the AICPA has changed the rules and is now allowing for continuous testing, candidates can now re-test for the same section within the same quarter after receiving their failed score.

The 18-month clock starts on on the date the first examination section passed was taken. If the remaining sections are not passed within the next 18 months, you lose the credit for the first section and the next section passed becomes the target date.

Example: If the grade release date for your passing Audit section was February 5, 2010 and Business Environments Concepts' section date was April 8, 2010, this means in order to retain credit for Audit you must pass the remaining sections on or before August 5, 2011, otherwise exam credit for this section expires and the remaining sections, including Audit, must be passed on or before October 8, 2011. The date you sat for the last exam is used to define the date you passed the exam under the 18-month.

Confidentiality
Since 1996, the Uniform CPA Exam has been a confidential examination. All persons involved with the Uniform CPA Exam, including candidates, must sign a confidentiality agreement not to disclose the contents of specific questions asked.

International Qualification Examination (IQEX)
Certain overseas qualified accountants may sit for the International Qualification Examination (IQEX). This is an alternative to the Uniform CPA Exam. As of 2018 this eligibility extends to the Institute of Chartered Accountants in Australia (ICAA), Chartered Professional Accountants of Canada (CPA Canada), Chartered Accountants Ireland (CAI), Institute of Chartered Accountants of Scotland (ICAS), Instituto Mexicano de Contadores Publicos (IMCP), Hong Kong Institute of Certified Public Accountants (HKICPA), New Zealand Institute of Chartered Accountants (NZICA), and CPA Australia.

Non-U.S. candidates
There is no specific bar to non-U.S. candidates sitting for the Uniform CPA Examination, however:

 It is possible to sit for the CPA Exam outside the USA but only in select country locations, which currently include Bahrain, Brazil, England, Ireland, Germany, Japan, Lebanon, Kuwait, Scotland, and the United Arab Emirates.
 Most states will accept non-U.S. education credentials, however they must normally be evaluated by a member of the National Association of Credential Evaluators. Some states prefer specific evaluators, such as Foreign Academic Credential Services or World Education Services, while the Illinois State Board of Accountancy prefers to conduct credential evaluations itself.
 Approximately one-third of the state boards require a candidate for the Uniform CPA Exam to be living or working in that state.  However, the majority have no residence requirement.
 A few U.S. states (such as the Alabama State Board of Public Accountancy) require the candidate to be a U.S. citizen or Permanent resident (Green card holder), and at least 19 years of age.
 As of October 1, 2018, testing sites in select cities of England, Ireland, Scotland, and Germany began offering the CPA Exam to eligible candidates.

Review methods 
There are a variety of ways to prepare for the CPA exam. Many candidates use a CPA Review course that includes AICPA released multiple choice questions and task-based simulations. It is completely up to the candidate as to how they prepare for the CPA exam.

Pass rates

The CPA Exam is challenging with pass rates historically below 50%.

History of exam formats
Until the mid-1990s, the Uniform CPA Exam was 19.5 hours in duration and was administered over two and one-half days. It consisted of four subject areas (sections) which were tested in five sittings: Auditing (3.5 hours); Business Law (3.5 hours); Accounting Theory (3.5 hours); and Accounting Practice (Part I & Part II; 4.5 hours each). Although Accounting Practice Parts I and II were given in separate sittings, the two scores were combined for grading purposes. The exam was administered twice per year: on the first consecutive Wednesday, Thursday and Friday in May and November of each year. Test takers were allowed to use only paper and pencil (no electronic calculators or computers of any kind were allowed at that time).

In 1994, the exam was restructured into a four-section, two-day exam. The subject matter was reorganized, primarily between Accounting Theory and Accounting Practice (Parts I and II). In addition, innovative machine-scorable test questions were incorporated to better assess the skills needed by CPAs to protect the public. For the first time, proprietary electronic calculators were provided to CPA candidates for the two new accounting sections. The four new sections were:

 Business Law and Professional Responsibilities
 Auditing
 Accounting and Reporting – Taxation, Managerial, and Governmental and Not-for-Profit Organizations
 Financial Accounting and Reporting – Business Enterprises

Until 1996, completely new versions of the CPA Exam were prepared and administered twice each year (May and November). After each administration, all questions and the keyed responses (correct answers) were published and available for purchase. Candidates were able to leave the test sites with their exam books, within certain time constraints imposed to preserve exam security. Beginning with the May 1996 administration, the exam became non-disclosed. Almost all exam material was now kept secure so that many high-quality questions could be reused. Although this is common practice in the world of large-scale testing, it was a policy decision that was momentous at the time, and made only after extensive comments were elicited from all key stakeholders, such as the 55 boards of accountancy, members of the CPA profession, accounting educators, CPA candidates, and testing professionals. By deciding to release only a small portion of each exam—to help candidates prepare for the examination experience high-quality exam material could be reused. This made it possible for the first time to use statistical techniques for test equating and to use criterion-referenced passing scores. Maintaining a large database of secure examination materials also made it possible for the CPA Exam to later transition to a computer-based administration format in 2004.

As of April 1, 2017, AICPA launched a new version of the Uniform CPA Exam. This updated version is the result of comprehensive research and places an increased emphasis on critical thinking, analytical ability, problem-solving and professional skepticism. The length of the exam increased from 14 to 16 hours with additional Task Based Simulations for each of the four sections. The Content Specification Outlines (CSOs) are replaced by Blueprints which will be released by AICPA each year. An additional change to the exam is an optional 15-minute break that will not count towards the 4-hour exam period.

On April 1, 2018, the AICPA rolled out new CPA Exam software that offers a more intuitive functionality. CPA candidates can practice with the software in advance of their actual test by using the AICPA's sample tests. The sample tests also include tutorial topics to guide candidates along with explanations of tools and resources.

In early 2019, the AICPA began a targeted practice analysis focused on the impact of technology and data analytics on the work of newly licensed CPAs as well core accounting skills that all CPAs must possess. After months of engaging with stakeholders from the profession, including supervisors of newly licensed CPAs, the AICPA published an Exposure Draft and Invitation to Comment. The Exposure Draft details major themes from the research along with proposed Exam content additions, changes, and deletions that will take effect sometime in 2021. The Invitation to Comment presents more future-oriented proposals that required further consideration and research. Both components of the report were posted for public comment on December 23, 2019.

See also
 American Institute of Certified Public Accountants
 Certified Public Accountant (CPA)
 International Qualification Examination
 National Association of State Boards of Accountancy

Notes

Examinations
Accounting in the United States